Saint-Rigomer-des-Bois is a former commune in the Sarthe department in the region of Pays de la Loire in north-western France. In 2015 it became part of Villeneuve-en-Perseigne. Its population was 453 in 2019.

See also
Communes of the Sarthe department
Parc naturel régional Normandie-Maine

References

Former communes of Sarthe